Playa Azul (en: Blue Beach) may refer to:

Places 
 Playa Azul (Michoacán), beach town in Michoacán, Mexico
 Playa Azul (Oaxaca), town in the municipality of Salina Cruz, Oaxaca, Mexico
 , town in Colonia department, Uruguay
 Playa Azul, a beach in Huanchaco District, Peru
 Playa Azul, a beach in Cazones de Herrera, Vera Cruz, Mexico
 Playa Azul, a nickname for Varadero, Cuba

Other 
 Playa Azul (Benidorm), one of the tallest buildings in Spain
 Playa Azul, a Mexican film that won Best Original Score at the 34th Ariel Awards
 "Playa Azul", a song by Los Amigos Invisibles from the 2002 album The Venezuelan Zinga Son, Vol. 1